The Reichskammergericht was one of the two highest judicial institutions in the Holy Roman Empire, the other one being the Aulic Council in Vienna. It was founded in 1495 by the Imperial Diet in Worms. All legal proceedings in the Holy Roman Empire could be brought to the Imperial Chamber Court, except if the ruler of the territory had a so-called privilegium de non appellando, in which case the highest judicial institution was found by the ruler of that territory. Another exception was criminal law in which the Imperial Chamber Court could intervene only if basic procedural rules had been violated.

The Imperial Chamber Court was infamous for the long time that it took to reach a verdict. Some proceedings, especially in lawsuits between different states of the Empire, took several hundred years. Some of the lawsuits had not been brought to an end when it was dissolved in 1806 following the downfall of the Holy Roman Empire. However, it has late been discovered that it could often be attributed to a loss of interest on the part of the parties involved, and that the court was sometimes much more efficient than previously thought. Sometimes, the court even ordered injunctions within a few days.

Recent research has also brought to light that especially in the 18th century, the rulings of the court anticipated in many ways the constitutional establishment of civil liberties in Germany. For instance, the inviolability of one's housing or freedom of trade was legally introduced in the Empire by rulings of the court. In the late 18th century, some contemporaries even compared the Imperial Chamber Court to the National Assembly in Revolutionary France.

History

At its foundation, the Imperial Chamber Court was seated in Frankfurt. It was later moved to Worms, Augsburg, Nürnberg, Regensburg, Speyer, Esslingen, Speyer again (from 1527 to 1689), and finally to Wetzlar until it was dissolved in 1806.

From the early Middle Ages, there had been a supreme court for the Empire, the Hofgericht, in which the Emperor himself presided. This court was connected directly to the Emperor, so it ceased to act when he was abroad, and it disbanded when he died. In the 15th century, the Emperor ceased to command as much respect, so his court lost the confidence of his subjects. Its place was taken by the Kammergericht.

The Emperor or a deputy presided in the Kammergericht and it was still his personal court, but the members were now officials of the Empire. It was generally the legal members of the council who sat in the Kammergericht. It fell into disuse in the later years of the reign of Frederick III. The creation of a new and efficient court became a matter of pressing necessity, and it was one of the most urgent of the reforms which were mooted in the reign of Maximilian I.

The "province of the Imperial Chamber", as it came to be gradually defined by statute and use, extended to breaches of the public peace, cases of arbitrary distraint (property seizure) or imprisonment, pleas which concerned the treasury, violations of the Emperor's decrees or the laws passed by the Imperial Diet, disputes about property between immediate tenants of the Empire or the subjects of different rulers, and finally suits against immediate tenants of the Empire, with the exception of criminal charges and matters relating to imperial fiefs, which went to the Aulic Council.

In all of its business, it suffered from the competition of the Aulic Council, and after the 16th century, it devoted itself exclusively to judicial work. Composed of the personal advisers of the Emperor, the Aulic Council did justice on his behalf. The competition between the Aulic Council and the Imperial Chamber was finally regulated by the Treaty of Westphalia in 1648, which laid down that the court which first dealt with a case should alone have competence to pursue it.

Composition
The court's composition was determined by both the Holy Roman Emperor and the subject states of the Empire. The Emperor appointed the chief justice (always a highborn aristocrat), several divisional chief judges, and some of the other puisne judges. The majority of the judges were selected by the estates of the realm.  Originally, half of the judges were Knights of the Empire, and the other half were law graduates, but after 1548, all judges had to be law graduates.

References

External links
 Society for Imperial Chamber Court Research, Wetzlar 
 Museum and Research Centre of the Imperial Chamber Court

Legal history of the Holy Roman Empire
1490s establishments in the Holy Roman Empire
1495 establishments in Europe
1806 disestablishments in the Holy Roman Empire
Buildings and structures in Wetzlar